Gopala Krishnudu is a 1982 Telugu-language film, produced by Bhimavarapu Bhuchchi Reddy and directed by A. Kodandarami Reddy. It stars Akkineni Nageswara Rao, Jayasudha, and Radha (in her Telugu debut), with music composed by Chakravarthy. The film was a remake of Tamil film Keezh Vaanam Sivakkum.

Plot 
Gopala Krishna (Akkineni Nageswara Rao) a playboy who spends his life frolicking. Gopi is the son of Dr. Murthy (again Akkineni Nageswara Rao), an eye specialist who is unaware of his son's vices. Once Gopi gets acquainted with a beautiful middle-class girl Sujatha (Jaya Sudha) and tries to trap her but she does not yield. Surprisingly, she turns as the daughter of Murthy's sister Kousalya (Dubbing Janaki) who has separated from him years ago. Before dying, she entrusts Sujatha's responsibility to her brother. After reaching Murthy's house, Sujatha realizes Gopi as her cousin, so, they make a play, Sujatha reforms Gopi by marrying him and the couple leads a joyful life. Soon after, a blind girl Radha (Radha) enters into their life through Dr.Murthy requesting him to get back her eyesight to take revenge against the person who deceived her. Unfortunately, he is none other than Gopi. At present, Murthy makes arrangements for Radha's operation and also gives her shelter. Eventually, Sujatha & Radha become good friends. At the same time, Sujatha is diagnosed with liver cancer and terminally ill. Listening to it, Gopi collapses also shocks spotting Radha and tries to avoid but she recognizes him. Immediately, she hits Murthy for the truth then he confesses that guilty is punished by explaining Sujatha's condition. Here Sujatha overhears their conversation. Finally, the movie ends Sujatha uniting Gopi & Radha and breathes her last happily by donating her eyes to Radha.

Cast 
Akkineni Nageswara Rao as Gopala Krishna & Dr. Murthy (dual role)
Jayasudha as Sujatha
Radha as Radha
Jaggayya as Dr. Rao
Allu Ramalingaiah as Vasanth
Rama Prabha as Govindamma
Sri Lakshmi
Rajyalakshmi
Subhashini
Halam
Athili Lakshmi as Lakshmi
Jhansi
Dubbing Janaki as Kousalya

Soundtrack 

Music composed by Chakravarthy. Lyrics were written by Veturi.

References

External links 

1980s Telugu-language films
Films directed by A. Kodandarami Reddy
Films scored by K. Chakravarthy
Telugu remakes of Tamil films